Alphacetylmethadol (INN), or α-acetylmethadol (AAM), is a synthetic opioid analgesic. Its levorotary enantiomer, levacetylmethadol, is an FDA-approved treatment for opioid addiction. Alphacetylmethadol is very similar in structure to methadone, a widely prescribed treatment for opioid addiction. In the United States, it is a Schedule I controlled substance under the Controlled Substances Act (presumably because it was never marketed in the US, as is the case with other common opiate/opioid medications such as heroin and prodine), with an ACSCN of 9603 and a 2013 annual manufacturing quota of 2 grammes.

See also 
 Levacetylmethadol
 Acetylmethadol
 Betacetylmethadol
 Alphamethadol

References 

Acetate esters
Dimethylamino compounds
Analgesics
Mu-opioid receptor agonists
Synthetic opioids

fi:Metadoli#Johdannaiset